John F. Kennedy High School or John F. Kennedy Catholic High School may refer to:

Canada
 John F. Kennedy High School (Montreal), in Montreal, Quebec

Germany
 John F. Kennedy School, Berlin, a primary and secondary school

United States
 John F. Kennedy High School (Delano, California)
 John F. Kennedy High School (Fremont, California)
 John F. Kennedy High School (Los Angeles)
 John F. Kennedy High School (La Palma, California)
 John F. Kennedy High School (Richmond, California)
 John F. Kennedy High School (Sacramento, California)
 John F. Kennedy High School (Colorado), in Denver, Colorado
 John F. Kennedy High School (Connecticut), in Waterbury, Connecticut
 John F. Kennedy High School (Florida), racially segregated, for colored students
 John F. Kennedy High School (Guam), in Tumon, Guam
 John F. Kennedy High School (Illinois), In Chicago, Illinois
 John F. Kennedy High School (Iowa), in Cedar Rapids, Iowa
 John F. Kennedy High School (Louisiana), in New Orleans, Louisiana
 John F. Kennedy High School (Maryland), in Montgomery County, Maryland
 John F. Kennedy High School (Michigan), in Taylor, Michigan (closed in 2018)
 John F. Kennedy Memorial High School (Mississippi), in Mound Bayou, Mississippi
 John F. Kennedy Catholic High School (Missouri), in Manchester, Missouri (closed in 2017)
 John F. Kennedy High School (Paterson, New Jersey)
 John F. Kennedy High School (Willingboro, New Jersey) (closed in 1989)
 John F. Kennedy Memorial High School (New Jersey), in Woodbridge Township, New Jersey
 John F. Kennedy High School (Bellmore, New York)
Plainview – Old Bethpage John F. Kennedy High School in Plainview, New York
 John F. Kennedy High School (New York City)
 John F. Kennedy High School (Cheektowaga, New York)
 John F. Kennedy Catholic High School (Somers, New York)
 John F. Kennedy High School (Cleveland, Ohio)
 John F. Kennedy High School (Warren, Ohio)
 John F. Kennedy High School (Oregon), in Mount Angel, Oregon
 John F. Kennedy High School (Texas), in San Antonio, Texas
 John F. Kennedy Catholic High School (Washington), in Burien, Washington

See also 
 Kennedy Catholic High School (disambiguation)
 Bloomington Kennedy High School, in Bloomington, Minnesota
 Plainview-Old Bethpage John F. Kennedy High School, in Plainview, New York
 John F. Kennedy Preparatory High School (now The St. Nazianz Christian Center), in St. Nazianz, Wisconsin 
 Robert F. Kennedy Community Schools Los Angeles, California
 Robert F. Kennedy Community High School  Queens, New York